This is a list of radio stations that broadcast on FM frequency 107.2 MHz:

China
 CNR Music Radio in Lijiang
 Story Channel

Finland
 Radio Sputnik (Kotka frequency)
 KISS Finland (Kruunupyy frequency)

France
 Radio Nova (Limoges frequency)
 Rire et Chansons (Mâcon frequency)

Greece
 Blue Space FM

India
 Gyan Bharathi

 Radio Nasha

New Zealand
Various low-power stations up to 1 watt

Romania
 VIBE FM (Piatra-Neamţ frequency)
 Renegade Radio 107.2 FM

South Africa
 Tuks FM

United Kingdom
 Awaz FM
 Bangor FM
 Castle FM
 Capital South
 KMFM Thanet
 Hits Radio South Coast
 Greatest Hits Radio Stamford and Rutland (Manton frequency)
 Six FM
 Greatest Hits Radio Bristol & The South West
 Greatest Hits Radio North West
 Greatest Hits Radio Black Country & Shropshire

References

Lists of radio stations by frequency